Duke Julius Frederick of Württemberg-Weiltingen (3 June 1588 in Montbéliard – 25 April 1635 in Strasbourg), was the first duke of Württemberg-Weiltingen.

Life 
Julius Frederick was the third son of the Duke Frederick I of Württemberg and his wife Sibylla of Anhalt.  He grew up with his parents and siblings in Montbéliard.  After his father took up government of Württemberg in 1593, Julius Frederick lived in Stuttgart.  He participated in military operations in the Alsace and in the War of the Jülich Succession.  He travelled extensively, including journeys to Asia Minor, Malta, and Ephesus, and, in 1615, to Lapland.

He chose Weiltingen as his residence. On 24 November 1617, he was engaged to Anna Sabina von Schleswig-Holstein-Sonderburg (7 March 1593 – 18 July 1659, daughter of John II, Duke of Schleswig-Holstein-Sonderburg). He married her on 11 December 1618 in Sønderborg. After the marriage, they lived in Brenz for a while, then moved to Weiltingen.

In 1631, he led the regency for his nephew Eberhard III.  That same year, he joined the League of Leipzig.  After the bloodless Cherry War later that year, he had to leave the League under the terms of the Peace of Tübingen.  When King Gustavus Adolphus of Sweden advanced into southern Germany, he raised troops again and joined Gustavus Adolphus.  This led to a dispute with the Government, the Estates, and his co-regent (Barbara Sophie of Brandenburg, the mother of Eberhard III).

In 1633, he renounced the regency in Württemberg.  After the Battle of Nördlingen, the whole ducal family, including Julius Frederick, fled to Strasbourg, where he died the following year.

Children 
The children from his marriage to Anna Sabina were:
 Roderick (1618–1651), Duke of Württemberg-Weiltingen
 Julia Felicitas (1619–1661)
 married in 1640 with Duke  John X of Schleswig-Holstein-Gottorp (1606–1655)
 Silvius I Nimrod (1622–1654), Duke of Württemberg-Oels
 married in 1647 with Duchess  Elisabeth Marie of Münsterberg-Oels (1625–1686)
 Floriana Ernestine (1623–1672)
 married in 1657 with Count Frederick Kraft of Hohenlohe-Pfedelbach (1623–1681)
 Faustina Marianna (1624–1679)
 Manfred I (1626–1662), Duke of Württemberg-Weiltingen
 married in 1652 with Countess Juliane of Oldenburg (1615–1691) and had issue:
 Duke Frederick Ferdinand von Württemberg-Weitlingen (1654–1705)
 married Elizabeth (1665–1726), daughter of George II, Duke of Württemberg-Montbéliard, and had issue:
 Sibylle Charlotte (1690–1735)
 married Charles Frederick II, Duke of Württemberg-Oels
 Hedwig Fredericka (1691–1752)
 married John Augustus, Prince of Anhalt-Zerbst
 Julius Peregrinatius (1627–1645)
 Sueno Martialis Edenolph (1629–1656)
 Amadea Fredonia (1631–1633)

References

External links 
 

1588 births
1635 deaths
17th-century dukes of Württemberg